"Clock on the Wall" is a song written by Randy Bachman and performed by The Guess Who.  It reached #16 in Canada in 1966.  The song was released in the United States as a single, but it did not chart.  It was featured on their 1966 album, It's Time.

The song was produced by Bob Burns and sung by Burton Cummings.

References

1966 songs
1966 singles
Songs written by Randy Bachman
The Guess Who songs
Quality Records singles
Scepter Records singles